André Mirambeau (born 8 November 1879, date of death unknown) was a French rower. He competed in the men's coxed four event at the 1912 Summer Olympics.

References

External links
 

1879 births
Year of death missing
French male rowers
Olympic rowers of France
Rowers at the 1912 Summer Olympics
Sportspeople from Alpes-de-Haute-Provence